Louny is a town in the Ústí nad Labem Region of the Czech Republic. It has about 18,000 inhabitants. It lies on the river Ohře. The town centre is well preserved and is protected by law as an urban monument zone.

Administrative parts
Villages of Brloh and Nečichy are administrative parts of Louny. Brloh forms an exclave of the municipal territory.

Etymology
The origin of the name Louny is unclear. Older theories, which are less likely, link the name to the personal name Lún, to the Czech word lůno (literally "womb", but here meaning "valley"), to the bird luňák (i.e. "kite"), or even to the Celtic word louwn ("lawn"). More modern and more likely theories attribute the origin of the name to the Old Czech words lunúti ("to flow fast") and lúňa / lúna ("current"), which refer to the local flow of the Ohře River.

Geography
The Ohře River flows through the town.

History

Already at the turn of the 11th–12th centuries there was a settlement named Luna, located on the site of today's Church of Saint Peter. The first written mention of the settlement is from 1115, when it was a property of Kladruby Abbey. In the 1260s, a royal town was founded at its place by King Ottokar II of Bohemia. It was located on two important traffic routes, river Ohře and the road from Prague to Nuremberg. Together with the town a Benedictine monastery was founded, but it was destroyed during the Hussite Wars.

The town rapidly developed in the 15th century, when Church of Saint Peter, Church of the Mother of God and town fortifications were built. After a fire in 1517, the town was severely damaged and had to be rebuilt, and a new church (Church of Saint Nicholas) was built.

During the 19th century and then in the 1960s and 1970s, there was extensive demolitions in the historical town and many valuable Renaissance houses and parts of town fortifications were destroyed. The economic development of Louny occurred in the second half of the 19th century, when railway repair shops, sugar factory, brewery, slaughterhouses, mills and financial institutions were founded. After 1945, industrialisation of Louny continued.

Until 1918, Laun – Louny was part of the Austrian monarchy (Austria side after the compromise of 1867), in the district of the same name, one of the 94 Bezirkshauptmannschaften in Bohemia.

Demographics

Economy
The town lies on a railway junction and a factory for overhauling railway engines and rolling stock, later known as Heavy Machinery Services, was established in 1873. It was a major employer and contributed to the town's expansion during the early 20th century. The company was the town's largest employer until 2014, when it went bankrupt. Since 2019, the industrial complex is rented to the DAKO-CZ company, which is a brake system manufacturer for rolling stock.

Other industries include a brewery (from the hops which are grown in the region) and a factory making porcelain electrical insulators for power cables. The largest employer with headquarters in Louny is Fujikoki Czech s.r.o. company, producer of thermostatic expansion valves used in car air conditioners.

Sights

The most important architectural feature is Roman Catholic Church of Saint Nicholas, built in the late Gothic style in 1519–1538. One of the architects was Benedikt Rejt. It incorporates a tower from an earlier church which was otherwise destroyed along with most of the town by a major fire in 1517. Other significant churches in the town are Church of Saint Peter from the 14th–15th century, Church of the Mother of God from 1493 and Church of Fourteen Holy Helpers from 1716.

The historic centre of Louny forms Mírové Square and its surroundings. The town hall on the square is a Neo-Renaissance building from 1887. The most valuable building on the square is a Renaissance house, today the seat of the district archive.

Parts of the town ramparts remain, as does the Žatec Gate which dates from 1500.

Notable people

Jaroslav Vrchlický (1853–1912), poet
Václav Hlavatý (1894–1969), mathematician
Otakar Jaroš (1912–1943), officer in the Czechoslovak forces in the Soviet Union
Božena Kacerovská (1880–1970), opera singer
Zdeněk Sýkora (1920–2011), painter
Milan Kymlicka (1936–2008), Czech-Canadian arranger, composer and conductor
Karolína Plíšková (born 1992), tennis player
Kristýna Plíšková (born 1992), tennis player

Twin towns – sister cities

Louny is twinned with:
 Barendrecht, Netherlands
 Lučenec, Slovakia
 Moret-Loing-et-Orvanne, France
 Zschopau, Germany

References

External links

History of the Louny Parish 

Cities and towns in the Czech Republic
Populated places in Louny District